Mahmoud Qasdy Ahmed Mourad Zulfikar (18 February 1914 – 22 May 1970) was an Egyptian film director, producer, screenwriter, and actor. He was a major figure in Egyptian film industry.

He started his career as an architect, before becoming an actor in 1939. Zulfikar was one of the most prominent artists in Egyptian cinema, he was known for his boldness and adventure with the new talents he presented to the Egyptian audience, later, he was nicknamed the "Talent Finder". Zulfikar was able to go beyond the limits of the film location with accurate calculations and through his imaginations, he could make his scripts alive. This earned him in Egypt the nickname of "The Event Maker".

Early life
Mahmoud Qasdy Ahmed Mourad Zulfikar was born on February 18, 1914, in Tanta, Egypt. His father, Ahmed Mourad Bek Zulfikar, served as a senior police commissioner in the Ministry of Interior and his mother Nabila hanem Zulfikar was a housewife. He was the fourth among eight siblings. His brother Mohamed who would grow up to be a businessman, Soad, Fekreya, Ezz El-Dine who would grow up to be a famous filmmaker. They were followed by brothers Kamal, Salah, the famous actor and producer and finally Mamdouh who would grow up to be a businessman.

Career
Mahmoud Zulfikar graduated from faculty of engineering and worked as an architect in the Design Department at the Ministry of Works, but his passion for movie business encouraged him to make a career shift and become a filmmaker. He was an actor, film producer, screenwriter, and film director.

Zulfikar was a comprehensive artist. He is one of the most talented filmmakers in the history of Egyptian cinema. He started as an actor in 1939, and directed 44 films between 1947 and 1970.  Zulfikar's films have been nominated for numerous awards both nationally and internationally. As an actor, his film debut was in Bayayet El Tiffah (1939). He starred in multiple commercial hits mostly as a director as well, including; Ibn El-balad (1942), El-Feloos (1945), Fauq Al Sahab (1947), Al lailu lana (1949), Akhlaq lil baye (1950), Qamar Arba'tashar (1950), and My Father Deceived Me (1951).

Zulfikar's notable films as a writer, director included; A Girl from Palestine (1948), Amint Bi Allah (1953), El Ard El Tayeba (1954), The Unknown Woman (1959), El Robat el Mukadass (1960), For Men Only (1964), Dearer than my Life (1965), Al Khroug Men Al Guana (1967), The Splendor of Love (1968), and Featureless Men (1972) which was released posthumously. Zulfikar’s 1963 film Soft Hands was entered into the 14th Berlin International Film Festival and he was nominated for Silver Bear for Best Director. As a producer, he established his film production company in early 1940s, produced almost 10 films including Miss Fatima (1952).

Personal life
Zulfikar married actress Aziza Amir, and together they made a successful duo. After her death he married Mariam Fakhreddine in 1952 and presented her to film industry, she became a famous actress in 1950s. They had one daughter, Iman. He’s the elder brother of Ezz El-Dine, film director and producer, and Salah, actor and producer.

Zulfikar died suddenly of a heart attack at the age of 56 on 22 May 1970 in Cairo, Egypt.

Filmography

Director

 1947 Hedeya 
 1948 Fatat men Falastin 
 1948 Fauq al sahab 
 1949 Al lailu lana
 1950 Virtue for Sale
 1951 Kisma wa nassib 
 1951 Khadaini abi 
 1953 Amint bi Allah 
 1953 Ghaltat el umr 
 1954 Bint el jiran 
 1954 El Ard el Tayeba 
 1954 The Neighbor's Daughter 
 1955 Rannet el kholkhal
 1957 Rihlah Gharamiyyah
 1958 Shabab el-Yom 
 1959 Forbidden Women
 1959 Touba
 1959 The Unknown Woman
 1960 El Imlak 
 1960 El Robat el Muqadass
 1961 El Morahek el Kabir 
 1961 El Hub Keda 
 1961 La Tazkorini 
 1961 Mawad maal Maadi 
 1962 Bala Demoue 
 1963 Imra'a fi dawama 
 1963 El Motamarreda
 1963 Soft Hands
 1964 Sanawat el hub 
 1964 Thaman el hub 
 1965 Aghla min hayati
 1965 Lel Regal Fakat
 1966 El Moraheka el Saghira 
 1966 El Talata yuhebbunaha 
 1966 Adou el Mara'a 
 1967 Agazat Gharam 
 1967 Al Koubla al Akhira 
 1967 El Khouroug min el Guana 
 1967 Nora 
 1968 Hekayet thalass banat 
 1968 Thalath Nessa
 1968 The Splendor of Love
 1969 Girls' Secrets
 1969 Fatat El Esste'rad 
1970 Borj El-Athraa
1970 Imra'at Zawgy 
1972 Regal bila Malameh

Writer
 1944 Taqiyyat al Ikhfa (screenplay) 
 1945 Ibnati (story)
 1945 El Feloos
 1947 Fauq el sahab (script) 
 1951 Khadaini abi (story & screenplay) 
 1954  El Ard el Tayeba (story) 
 1958 Shabab el-Yom (Writer)
 1963 Imra'a fi dawama
 1964 Thaman el hub (writer)

Producer
 1944 Hababa
 1945 El-Bani Adam
 1946 Shama'a Tahtareq
 1947 Hedeya
 1948 Fauq el sahab
 1951 Khadaini abi
 1952 El-Ustazah Fatmah
 1954 El Ard el Tayeba

Actor
 1939 Bayayet El Tiffah
 1940 El awda il al rif
 1941 El Warsha  
 1942 Masnaa el zawjate 
 1942 Ibn El-balad
 1942 Wedding Night 
 1943 Wadi el Nogoom 
 1945 Al-Anissa Busa 
 1945 Al-Fulus 
 1945 Ibnati 
 1947 Hadaya 
 1947 Fauq el sahab
 1948 Fatat men Falastin
 1949 Afrah 
 1949 Nadia 
 1949 Al lailu lana
 1950 Ayni bi-triff 
 1950 Akhlaq lel-Bai
 1950 Qamar Arba'tashar
 1951 Khadaini abi
 1953 El shak el katel 
 1955 Assafir el Ganna 
 1957 Hareb minel hub 
 1968 El-Sit el-Nazra

See also 
 List of film directors
 Lists of Egyptian films
 Top 100 Egyptian films

References

External links

Mahmoud Zulfikar at elCinema

1914 births
1970 deaths
Egyptian film directors
Egyptian male film actors
Egyptian screenwriters
Egyptian film producers
People from Tanta
20th-century Egyptian male actors
20th-century screenwriters